SATENA (acronym of Servicio Aéreo a Territorios Nacionales) is a Colombian government-owned airline based in Bogotá, Colombia. It operates mostly domestic routes. Its main hub is El Dorado International Airport.

History

SATENA was first established on April 12, 1962, by the President of the Republic, Alberto Lleras Camargo, who created the airline using Decree 940 in order

"to form an aerial transport service for the benefit of the underdeveloped regions of the country, with the object of promoting the welfare of educational campaigns, agricultural and pastoral development and the economic and social progress of such territories."

In order to achieve this under government auspices, the airline was then entrusted to the control of the Colombian Air Force, initiating its first operations with the routes Bogotá - Leticia and Leticia – Tarapacá – El Encanto – Puerto Leguízamo. The Government equipped the company with one C-54, two C-47, two Beaver L-20, and later added two PBY Catalina amphibious, the property of the Rotary Fund of the Colombian Air Force. Later, in 1964, it added three additional C-47 and two more C-54 aircraft, all of them donated by the United States International Development Agency.

In 1965, SATENA, in coordination with the Bank of Bogotá, began a new service named AeroBanco, which was created to facilitate air travel to other areas largely or completely inaccessible by road. Due to great success in the areas served by the airline, President Carlos Lleras Restrepo put into effect Law 80 of December 12, 1968, where it was decreed that SATENA would be treated as a public establishment, with all legal functions controlled by the Ministry of National Defence.

In 1972, SATENA acquired newer British-Built AVRO HS-748 turboprops capable of carrying 48 passengers. Between 1984 and 1985, the airline incorporated two Fokker F28 jet aircraft with the capacity to transport 65 passengers.

Since its creation, the airline has performed many public services on behalf of the Colombian people, having provided service during crises in the country's history, as was the case of the Huila and Cauca earthquake of June 6, 1994, when SATENA performed search and rescue operations, airlifted local residents, as well as transporting needed medicines, foods and aid in general to the site of the tragedy.

In 1996, the largest modernization of the airline began, with the arrival of six Dornier 328s capable of carrying 32 passengers. These aircraft represent the new generation of equipment for regional routes.

In 2002, SATENA incorporated into its fleet one Embraer ERJ-145 with capacity for 50 passengers which arrived to replace the departing Fokker F28, which was reaching its maximum airframe hours. In 2004, SATENA became the airline with the newest and most modern aerial fleet in Colombia, when it incorporated two new Embraer ERJ 145 aircraft, allowing it to perform faster and more efficient services to its most isolated destinations.

At the end of 2010, SATENA suffered a financial crisis, consisting of bank debts amounting to 120 billion pesos and losses totaling 25 billion pesos. Due to this, the National Government proposes the law that would allow the commercial airline to get out of said crisis and compete in the air transport market in the country. This law consists of capitalizing this company at 98 billion pesos, where 49% of the company's shares will be put up for sale in a democratic process and within a period of two years, while the remaining 51% would continue in hands of the state, something that was never done in the end.

On April 29, 2018, the airline moved all its routes to the Terminal Puente Aéreo belonging to El Dorado International Airport, in order to facilitate the service to passengers on regional flights.

Destinations

Fleet

Current fleet

As of March 2023, the SATENA fleet consists of the following aircraft:

Former fleet
SATENA had formerly operated the following aircraft:

ATR 72-500
Boeing 727-100
Boeing 727-200
CASA C-212 Aviocar
de Havilland Canada DHC-2 Beaver
Dornier 328
Douglas C-47 Skytrain
Douglas C-54 Skymaster
Douglas DC-9-10
Embraer EMB 120 Brasilia
Embraer ERJ-170
Fokker F-28 Fellowship
Harbin Y-12E
Hawker Siddeley HS 748
Let L-410 Turbolet
PBY Catalina
Pilatus PC-6 Porter

Accidents and incidents
On September 8, 1969, Douglas C-47 FAC-685 crashed near Apiay Air Force Base killing all 32 people on board. The aircraft was operating a domestic scheduled passenger flight from Monterrey Airport to Apiay.
On January 21, 1972, Douglas DC-3 FAC-661 crashed at San Nicolas whilst operating a domestic non-scheduled passenger flight from Enrique Olaya Herrera Airport, Medellín to Gerardo Tobar López Airport, Buenaventura.
On January 9, 1974, HS 748 (FAC 1103) crashed into the Gabinete Peak 50 km north of Gustavo Artunduaga Paredes Airport Florencia whilst on a flight from Florencia to Bogota. All 31 people on board were killed. 
On January 8, 1975, Douglas DC-3 (FAC-688) crashed shortly after take-off from Benito Salas Airport, Neiva on a flight to Gustavo Artunduaga Paredes Airport, Florencia. All 30 people on board were killed.
On May 3, 1975, Douglas DC-3 (FAC-663) crashed at Sardinata. The aircraft was on a domestic scheduled passenger flight from Aguas Claras Airport, Ocaña to Camilo Daza Airport, Cúcuta. Three of the six occupants were killed.
On April 2, 1976, Douglas DC-3 (FAC-676) crashed on approach to Tres de Mayo Airport, Puerto Asís. The aircraft was on a flight from Gustavo Artunduaga Paredes Airport, Florencia. Five of the 16 people on board were killed.
On February 17, 1977, Douglas C-47B (FAC-1125) was damaged beyond economic repair in a take-off accident at Fabio Alberto León Bentley Airport, Mitú. All 28 people on board survived.
On November 20, 1977, Douglas C-47B (FAC-1127) crashed in Colombia.
On November 20, 1977, Douglas C-47A (FAC-1120) crashed at Llanos del Yori, Colombia.
On February 21, 1978, Douglas DC-3 (FAC-668) crashed at Serranía los Cobardes in Colombia.
On June 25, 1981, Douglas C-47 (FAC-1129) was damaged beyond repair in an accident. The aircraft was subsequently withdrawn from use and stored at La Vanguardia Airport, Villavicencio.
On May 3, 1983, Douglas C-47B (FAC-1126) was damaged beyond repair in an accident at Palmaseca Airport, Cali.
On May 5, 2010, an Embraer ERJ-145 overran the runway at Fabio Alberto León Bentley Airport, Mitú, Colombia. The aircraft crashed through the airport fence and then came to rest in a field, suffering substantial damage. None of the 37 passengers and 4 crew was injured. The runway at the time of the accident was wet as it had recently rained in the area.

See also
List of airlines of Colombia

References

External links

SATENA 
SATENA route map
Satena photos by MyAviation.net
Video Tribute

Airlines of Colombia
Airlines established in 1962
Government-owned companies of Colombia
Military airlines
Transport in Bogotá
Colombian companies established in 1962